Satveer Singh Gurjar is an Indian politician and a member of the 16th Legislative Assembly of India. He represents the Dadri constituency of Uttar Pradesh and is a member of the Bahujan Samaj Party political party.

Early life and education
Satveer Singh Gurjar was born in  a Gurjar family of Village Barola Gautam Budhha Nagar district within the National Capital Region, India. He attended the S. K. Inter College and is educated till tenth grade.

Political career
Satveer Singh Gurjar has been an MLA for two terms. He represented the Dadri constituency and is a member of the Bahujan Samaj Party political party.

Posts held

See also
 Sixteenth Legislative Assembly of Uttar Pradesh
 Uttar Pradesh Legislative Assembly

References

1962 births
Living people
Bahujan Samaj Party politicians from Uttar Pradesh
People from Gautam Buddh Nagar district
Uttar Pradesh MLAs 2007–2012
Uttar Pradesh MLAs 2012–2017
Uttar Pradesh politicians